"Why" is a debut solo single by Chinese singer Zhou Jieqiong released on September 6, 2018, which marks her solo debut since her debut with Pristin in 2016.

Background
On August 31, 2018 Pledis Entertainment confirmed that Zhou would be making her solo debut in China on September 6, 2018 with digital single "Why".

Composition
"Why" is a tropical sound, moombahton song with the lyrics talking about Zhou's confidence in being a confident woman.

Promotions
Zhou had her solo debut stage in China the day after the song's release on iQiyi's Idol Hits.

Charts

Release history

References

2018 songs
Chinese-language songs
2018 singles